The Terminal Railway Alabama State Docks  is a terminal railroad according to the AAR.

Connections
Alabama and Gulf Coast Railway at Mobile, Alabama
Alabama Export Railway at Mobile, Alabama
Burlington Northern Santa Fe at Mobile, Alabama
Canadian National at Mobile, Alabama
CG Railway at Mobile, Alabama
CSX Transportation at Mobile, Alabama
Kansas City Southern at Mobile, Alabama
Norfolk Southern at Mobile, Alabama

Industries
The TASD serves 25 different customers mostly in chemicals and bulk goods.  The railroad moves over 100,000 carloads annually transporting goods such as containers, coal, metal products, lumber/building supplies, paper, chemicals, petroleum products, aggregates, cement, grains, and agricultural products. The TASD also earns extra profits from the movement and storage of freight cars for other railroads.

Equipment
The Terminal Railway Alabama State Docks operates eight EMD MP15 switcher locomotives.

Current locomotive roster

Historical Locomotive Roster

References

External links

Alabama State Port Authority

Alabama railroads
Switching and terminal railroads
Transportation in Mobile, Alabama